2033 Basilea, provisional designation , is a stony asteroid from the inner regions of the asteroid belt, approximately 6 kilometers in diameter. It was discovered  on 6 February 1973, by astronomer Paul Wild at the Zimmerwald Observatory near Bern, Switzerland. The asteroid was named for the Swiss city of Basel.

Classification and orbit 

Basilea orbits the Sun in the inner main-belt at a distance of 2.0–2.5 AU once every 3 years and 4 months (1,212 days). Its orbit has an eccentricity of 0.11 and an inclination of 8° with respect to the ecliptic.

Physical characteristics

Lightcurves 

In December 2015, a rotational lightcurve of Basilea was obtained from photometric observations by astronomers Petr Pravec, Peter Kušnirák and Donald Pray. Lightcurve analysis gave a rotation period of 6.5287 hours with a brightness variation of 0.28 magnitude.

Diameter and albedo 

According to the survey carried out by the NEOWISE mission of NASA's Wide-field Infrared Survey Explorer, Basilea measures between 5.710 and 6.322 kilometers in diameter and its surface has an albedo between 0.29 and 0.419.

The Collaborative Asteroid Lightcurve Link assumes a standard albedo for stony asteroids of 0.20 and calculates a diameter of 7.82 kilometers based on an absolute magnitude of 12.9.

Naming 

This minor planet was named for the Swiss city of Basel, as well as for the Astronomical Institute of the University of Basel on the occasion of its 50th anniversary. The approved naming citation was published by the Minor Planet Center on 1 June 1980.

Notes

References

External links 
 Asteroid Lightcurve Database (LCDB), query form (info )
 Dictionary of Minor Planet Names, Google books
 Asteroids and comets rotation curves, CdR – Observatoire de Genève, Raoul Behrend
 Discovery Circumstances: Numbered Minor Planets (1)-(5000) – Minor Planet Center
 
 

002033
Discoveries by Paul Wild (Swiss astronomer)
Named minor planets
19730206